Dellums is a surname. Notable people with the surname include:

C. L. Dellums (1900–1989), American labor activist
Erik Dellums (born 1964), American actor
Piper Dellums, American author and public speaker
Ron Dellums (1935–2018), American politician

See also
Ronald V. Dellums Federal Building, federal building complex in Oakland, California
Dellums v. Bush, a D.C. Federal District Court decision by United States District Judge Harold H. Greene